A rolleron is a type of aileron used for rockets and used to provide passive stabilization against rotation. While most commonly used to stablize against roll, it can also be used for counteracting yaw and pitch as well.

In the early 1950s, the first rollerons were produced. Its value for the dynamic stabilization of missiles led to it being promptly studied by the National Advisory Committee for Aeronautics (NACA). It proved to be a more compact, simpler, and reliable solution to controlling roll than preceding methods, such as the combination of servomechanisms and ailerons. Rolleron devices have been widely used on maneuverable close-range air-to-air missiles, such as the prolific AIM-9 Sidewinder. Rocket vehicles have also become another common application.

History
During the early 1950s, the first examples of the rolleron, sometimes initially referred to as a roll damper, emerged. Due to its potential value as a missile stabilisation device, it was quickly subject to in-depth evaluations by, amongst other organisations, the National Advisory Committee for Aeronautics (NACA). The early missiles in use by the mid-1950s were typified by their limited damping of aerodynamic roll as a consequence of their low-aspect ratio lifting surfaces. The historic solution to this issue was to install a servomechanism to sense the roll rate and make adjustments to a conventional aileron as to counteract as required; this approach added complexity and weight, and took up limited space. Thus, less impinging methods were urgently sought, with a preference for those that required no internal component whatsoever.

Amongst other conclusions, by November 1956, NACA had determined the rolleron to have a reliable design approach for missile configurations. At the behest of the US military, further tests were conducted to validate its performance on production missiles. More generally, further innovations and patents associated with rollerons have been made over the following decades. Into the 1990s, the rolleron, along with potential applications for it, has continued to be examined by various organisations and nations.

Function
The rolleron is a relatively simple and cost-effective stabilizing device. The core element of a rolleron is a metal flywheel that is typically positioned at the trailing end of a fin. The wheel has notches cut into its circumference; these notches intentionally protrude as to maximise their interaction with the airflow. As such, while the missile is in motion through the air, the resulting air current generated causes the rolleron to rotate. While spinning, the flywheel resists any lateral forces acting on it, in a manner similar to a gyroscope. The benefit of this gyroscopic motion is that it counteracts the missile's undesirable tendency to rotate about its central axis, dynamically stablising its flight. In addition to stablising against roll, a similar effect can also be provided for yaw and pitch as well.

It has been assessed to be considerably valuable for missiles requiring a high level of maneuverability, as used in shorter-range dogfights between fighter aircraft. One prominent air-to-air missile, the AIM-9 Sidewinder missile, was an early adopter of the rolleron. Such devices are present on all four of its rear wings. By eliminating roll tendencies, the rolleron makes it considerably easier for a missile carry out its core functions, such as target tracking. Furthermore, the rolleron has also become a typical feature on rocket vehicles.

References

External links

 Unusual mechanism: The rolleron, Make magazine
 Test of rolleron for an amateur built rocket
 

Aircraft wing components
Rocketry